Alcis variegata is a moth of the family Geometridae. It is found in India, Sikkim, Nepal, Myanmar, Laos, southern China, northern Vietnam, Thailand, Peninsular Malaysia and Sumatra.

References

Moths described in 1888
Boarmiini
Moths of Asia